The United States Senate Committee on Patents was a committee of the United States Senate.  It was established September 7, 1837 as the "Committee on Patents and the Patent Office" when the Senate approved a resolution of Henry Hubbard of Kentucky. Prior to this, legislation and other matters relating to patents and the Patent Office were referred to the United States Senate Committee on the Judiciary.

History 
In 1869, the name of the committee was shortened to simply the Committee on Patents, which it remained until the committee was eliminated by the provisions of the Legislative Reorganization Act of 1946. Beginning January 2, 1947, jurisdiction over patents, the Patent Office, and patent law reverted to the United States Senate Judiciary Subcommittee on Patents, Copyrights, and Trademarks.

The comparable committee in the United States House of Representatives was also called the Committee on Patents.

Chairmen and Members
 1837-1838: John Ruggles (D-ME)
 1838-1840: Robert Strange (D-NC)
 1840-1841: Daniel Sturgeon (D-PA)
 1841-1842: Samuel Prentiss (W-VT)
 1842-1843: John Leeds Kerr (W-MD)
 Members: Augustus S. Porter (W-MI), John B. Henderson (W-MS), Leonard Wilcox (D-NH), Daniel Sturgeon (D-PA)
 1843-1845: Samuel S. Phelps (W-VT)
 1845-1846: Simon Cameron (D-PA) 
 1846-1847: Walter Colquitt (D-GA)
 1847-1849: James D. Westcott (D-FL)
 1849-1851: Hopkins Turney (D-TN)
 1851-1852: Moses Norris Jr. (D-NH)
 1852-1857: Charles Tillinghast James (D-RI)
 1857-1859: David S. Reid (D-NC)
 1859-1861: William Bigler (D-PA)
 1861-1862: James F. Simmons (R-RI)
 1862-1866: Edgar Cowan (R-PA)
 1866-1871: Waitman Willey (R-WV)
 1871-1875: Orris S. Ferry (R/LR/R-CT)
 1875-1877: Bainbridge Wadleigh (R-NH)
 Members: Newton Booth (AM-CA), Jerome B. Chaffee (R-CO), John W. Johnston (D-VA), Francis Kernan (D-NY)
 1877-1879: Newton Booth (R-CA)
 1879-1881: Francis Kernan (D-NY)
 1881-1887: Orville H. Platt (R-CT)
 1887-1889: Henry M. Teller (R-CO)
 1889-1891: Nathan F. Dixon, III (R-RI)
 1891-1893: George Gray (D-DE)
 1893-1899: Orville H. Platt (R-CT)
 1899-1903: Jeter Pritchard (R-NC)
 1903-1907: Alfred Kittredge (R-SD)
 1907-1909: Reed Smoot (R-UT)
 1909-1913: Norris Brown (R-NE)
 1913-1918: Ollie M. James (D-KY)
 1918-1919: William F. Kirby (D-AR)
 1919-1921: George Norris (R-NE)
 1921-1923: Hiram W. Johnson (R-CA)
 1923-1925: Richard P. Ernst (R-KY)
 1925-1926: William M. Butler (R-MA)
 1926:      Richard P. Ernst (R-KY)
 1926-1929: Jesse H. Metcalf (R-RI)
 1929-1932: Charles W. Waterman (R-CO); 
 Members: George W. Norris (R-NE), Ellison D. Smith (D-SC), Phillips Lee Goldsborough (R-MD), Edwin S. Broussard (D-LA), Felix Herbert (R-RI), C.C. Dill (D-WA)
 1932-1933: Felix Hebert (R-RI)
 1933:      Robert F. Wagner (D-NY)
 1934-1938: William Gibbs McAdoo (D-CA)
 1939-1944: Homer T. Bone (D-WA)
 1944-1947: Claude Pepper (D-FL)

References
Senate Historian's Office
Records of the Committee on Patents and the Patent Office, 1837-69 and the Committee on Patents, 1869-1946, Records of the Committee on the Judiciary and Related Committees, 1816–1968, Guide to the Records of the U.S. House of Representatives at the National Archives, 1789-1989 (Record Group 46), National Archives and Records Administration

Notes

External links
 

Patents
1837 establishments in the United States
1947 disestablishments in the United States
United States patent law